Shrook Wafa (born 13 May 1997) is an Egyptian chess player who holds the title of Woman Grandmaster.

She won the Women's African Chess Championship in 2013. Thanks to this achievement she earned the title of Woman grandmaster (WGM) and qualified for the Women's World Chess Championship 2015.

She has won the Women's African Chess Championship a further three times:  2014, 2016 and 2019.

In the Women's World Chess Championship 2015 she was knocked out in the first round by the second seed Ju Wenjun.

Her sister Shahenda Wafa also is a Woman Grandmaster.

References

External links 
 
 

1997 births
Living people
Egyptian female chess players
Chess woman grandmasters
African Games gold medalists for Egypt
African Games medalists in chess
Competitors at the 2011 All-Africa Games
Competitors at the 2019 African Games
21st-century Egyptian women